Admiral Sir Albemarle Bertie, 1st Baronet,  (20 January 1755 – 24 February 1824) was a long-serving and at the time controversial officer of the Royal Navy who saw extensive service in his career, but also courted controversy with several of his actions.

Bertie won recognition for unsuccessfully defending his ship against superior odds in the American Revolutionary War. He was later criticised however for failing to close with the enemy at the Glorious First of June and later for pulling rank on a subordinate officer just days before the capture of the French island of Mauritius and taking credit for the victory. Despite these controversies, Bertie was rewarded for his service with a baronetcy and the Order of the Bath, retiring in 1813 to his country estate at Donnington, Berkshire.

Childhood
Albemarle Bertie was born at Swinstead in Lincolnshire in 1755, the natural son of Lord Albemarle Bertie, the brother of Peregrine Bertie, 3rd Duke of Ancaster and Kesteven and Brownlow Bertie, 5th Duke of Ancaster and Kesteven, by Mary Coleback and much of his childhood is undocumented.

Early naval career
It is not clear when he entered the Navy, although he was gazetted lieutenant in December 1777 aged 22, quite a bit older than most of his contemporaries. Within a year of promotion, Bertie had witnessed combat on the repeating frigate  at the First Battle of Ushant, a brief and inconclusive action which resulted in a court martial for Admiral Hugh Palliser, a court martial at which Commander Bertie (as he by then was), was called on to give evidence in 1779. The intervening two years had been highly eventful, Bertie spending most of it as a prisoner of war in France after Fox had been taken by the larger French  on 11 September 1778.

American Revolutionary War
Following his exchange and appearance as a witness, Bertie spent two years without a ship, due to the shortage of available positions for young officers during the American Revolutionary War. On 21 March 1782, after a change of government, Bertie was reinstated and made captain of the 24-gun frigate  stationed in the Channel, serving in her until June. He remained on half-pay throughout the 1780s, marrying Emma Heywood of Maristow House in Devon on 1 July 1783, and having four children: Lyndsey James, Catherine Brownlow, Emma and Louisa Frances. His wife Emma predeceased him, dying in March 1805. He briefly commanded the frigate  between October and December 1787.

French Revolutionary and Napoleonic Wars
In 1790 at the Spanish armament, Bertie gained command of the frigate  before progressing to captain of a ship of the line,  in 1792, in which he assisted at the capture of the French privateer Le Général Dumourier, and her prize St. Iago, having on board more than two million dollars, besides valuable cargo worth between two and three hundred thousand pounds. With Thunderer and Howe, Bertie participated in the Atlantic campaign of May 1794 and the culminating Glorious First of June. Howe omitted Bertie from his dispatches of the battle and Bertie was not awarded a commemorative medal like many of the other captains. His failure to close with the French fleet was later cited against him.

On 23 April 1804, Bertie was promoted to rear-admiral, climbing the ranks over the next three years until he was senior enough to become admiral in charge of the Cape of Good Hope Station off South Africa, being promoted to vice-admiral on 28 April 1808. He served off South Africa for the next two years, suddenly sailing in late 1810 to take over the operations to invade Mauritius and seize it from the French. Most of the fighting had already been concluded by Admiral William O'Bryen Drury before Bertie's arrival and Drury was furious at Bertie's behaviour, writing several strong letters to the Admiralty in protest.

Bertie returned to Britain in 1811 and endured a brief political storm over his actions at Mauritius, which had been criticised by his fellow senior officer on the island, Lord Minto. Angered, Bertie requested court martial to defend his conduct but was firmly refused by the Admiralty, which did not wish for another scandal. A change of government the following year changed the political situation however and Bertie was returned to favour and presented with a baronetcy on 8 December 1812 as reward for the capture of Mauritius, Drury having died in the meantime.

Retirement
Retiring to his country estate at Donnington in Berkshire, Bertie continued to be promoted post-retirement, becoming a full admiral on 4 June 1814. He was also made a Knight Commander of the Order of the Bath on the restructuring of the orders of knighthood, on 2 January 1815. He died in 1824 after ten years' retirement, and his title was inherited by his only son Sir Lyndsey James Bertie, 2nd Bt., then a lieutenant in the 12th Regiment of Dragoons. Although sources do explicitly state that his son succeeded to the Baronetcy, Lieutenant Bertie appears to have died at Waterloo in July 1815, and is not mentioned in the will of Admiral Bertie, drafted in August 1815.

Notes

Bibliography
 
 

|-

1755 births
1824 deaths
Royal Navy admirals
Baronets in the Baronetage of the United Kingdom
Knights Commander of the Order of the Bath
Royal Navy personnel of the American Revolutionary War
Royal Navy personnel of the French Revolutionary Wars
British naval commanders of the Napoleonic Wars
People from Shaw-cum-Donnington
People from South Kesteven District